This is a list of the historical events and publications of 2015 in Australian literature.

Major publications

Literary fiction
 Tony Birch – Ghost River
 Geraldine Brooks – The Secret Chord
 Stephen Daisley – Coming Rain
 Gregory Day – Archipelago of Souls
 Peggy Frew – Hope Farm
 Susan Johnson – The Landing
 Gail Jones – A Guide to Berlin
 Myfanwy Jones – Leap
 Mireille Juchau – The World Without Us
 Malcolm Knox – The Wonder Lover
 Amanda Lohrey – A Short History of Richard Kline
 A. S. Patrić – Black Rock White City
 Steve Toltz – Quicksand
 Lucy Treloar – Salt Creek
 Charlotte Wood – The Natural Way of Things

Children's and Young Adult fiction
 Nick Earls – New Boy
 Mem Fox – This & That
 Mem Fox – Nellie Belle
 Andy Griffiths – The 65-Storey Treehouse
 Maureen McCarthy – Stay With Me
 Sophie Masson – Hunter's Moon
 Gillian Mears – The Cat with the Coloured Tail
 Louis Nowra – Prince of Afghanistan
 Emily Rodda – Two Moons
 Lili Wilkinson – Green Valentine
 Fiona Wood – Cloudwish

Crime
 Peter Corris – Gun Control
 Garry Disher – The Heat
 Mark Dapin – R&R
 Candice Fox – Fall
 Katherine Howell – Tell the Truth
 Adrian McKinty – Gun Street Girl
 Barry Maitland – Ash Island
 Michael Robotham – Close Your Eyes
 Emma Viskic – Resurrection Bay
 Dave Warner – Before It Breaks

Science Fiction and Fantasy
 K. A. Bedford – Black Light
 John Birmingham – Resistance
 James Bradley – Clade
 Trudi Canavan — Angel of Storms
 Isobelle Carmody – The Red Queen
 Kate Forsyth — The Beast's Garden
 Jane Rawson – Formaldehyde

Poetry
 Robert Adamson – Net Needle
 David Brooks – Open House
 Clive James – Sentenced to Life
 Les Murray – Waiting for the Past

Drama
 Matthew Whittet, Seventeen

Biographies
 David Day – Paul Keating : The Biography
 Peter Garrett – Big Blue Sky : A Memoir
 Kate Grenville – One Life : My Mother's Story
 Erik Jensen – Acute Misfortune: The Life and Death of Adam Cullen
 Gerald Murnane – Something for the Pain : A Memoir of the Turf
 Brenda Niall – Mannix
 Magda Szubanski – Reckoning : A Memoir
 Tim Winton – Island Home : A Landscape Memoir

Non-fiction
 Joel Deane – Catch and Kill: The Politics of Power
 Andrew Fowler – The War on Journalism: Media Moguls, Whistleblowers and the Price of Freedom
 Gideon Haigh – Certain Admissions
 Lucy Sussex – Blockbuster! : Fergus Hume and the Mystery of the Hansom Cab
 Sam Vincent – Blood & Guts

Awards and honours

Note: these awards were presented in the year in question.

Lifetime achievement

Fiction

National

Children and Young Adult

National

Crime and Mystery

International

National

Science Fiction

Non-Fiction

Poetry

Drama

Deaths
 28 January – Lionel Gilbert, 90, historian, author, and academic, (born 1924)
 29 January — Colleen McCullough, 77, novelist (born 1937)
 13 February — Faith Bandler, 96, author and civil rights activist (born 1918)
 23 February — James Aldridge, 96, novelist (born 1918)
 24 March – Alan Seymour, 87, playwright (born 1927)
 20 May – J. S. Harry, poet, 76 (born 1939)
 4 October — Nan Hunt, children's writer who also wrote as N. L. Ray (died 2015)

See also
 Literature
 List of years in Australian literature
 List of Australian literary awards
 2014 in Australian literature
 2015 in Australia
 2015 in literature
 2016 in Australian literature

References

Note: all references relating to awards can, or should be, found on the relevant award's page.

Literature
Australian literature by year
Years of the 21st century in Australia
Years of the 21st century in literature